The BAR 003 was the car with which the British American Racing team competed in the  Formula One season.  It was driven by Jacques Villeneuve, who was in his third year with the team, and Olivier Panis, who joined from a year out of racing as McLaren's test driver.

Overview 

However, the team took a step backwards. The car suffered from a handling problem, caused by a lack of rigidity in the chassis, which caused a slide in competitiveness as the year progressed, and was also often unreliable. The same could be said of the works Honda engines, which were also down-on-power compared to the units of the top teams. However, the team were still generally outpaced by rivals Jordan, whose EJ11 used the same engines.

The highlights were Villeneuve's two podium finishes at Catalunya and Hockenheim, but even these were achieved due to a high rate of attrition in both races. Villeneuve was pushed hard by Panis throughout the season, but the Frenchman was rewarded with little in the way of hard results.

The team eventually finished sixth in the Constructors' Championship, with 17 points.

BAR used 'Lucky Strike' logos in all other competitions except the French and British Grands Prix, and 'EA Sports' logos in the United States.

Complete Formula One results
(key) (results in bold indicate pole position)

References 

 

BAR Formula One cars
2001 Formula One season cars